Ramal da Siderurgia Nacional is a Portuguese freight railway line which connects the station of Coina to the industrial complex of Siderurgia Nacional. The line opened in March 2008.

See also 
 List of railway lines in Portugal
 History of rail transport in Portugal

References

Railway lines in Portugal
Iberian gauge railways
Railway lines opened in 2008